William Scott  (15 February 1913 – 28 December 1989) was a Northern Irish artist, known for still-life and abstract painting. He is the most internationally celebrated of 20th-century Ulster painters. His early life was the subject of the film Every Picture Tells a Story, made by his son James Scott.

Exhibitions
Scott represented Britain in 1958 at the Venice Biennale. He exhibited at the Hanover Gallery in London, at the Martha Jackson Gallery in New York, Italy, Switzerland, West Germany, France, the Kasahara Gallery in Japan, Canada and Australia, at the Dawson Gallery, Dublin, as well as Belfast.
Retrospectives of his work were held at the Tate Gallery, London in 1972, in Edinburgh, Dublin and Belfast in 1986, by the Irish Museum of Modern Art, Dublin in 1998 and the Jerwood Gallery in 2013.

Selected works
Still Life With Orange Note (1970), Oil on canvas, Arts Council of Northern Ireland collection
Cornish Harbour (1951), Lithograph, Museum of New Zealand Te Papa Tongarewa collection
Fish (1951), Lithograph, Museum of New Zealand Te Papa Tongarewa collection
Portrait of a girl (1948), Lithograph, Museum of New Zealand Te Papa Tongarewa collection
Girl Seated at a Table (1938), formerly owned by David Bowie

References

 'William Scott' Norbert Lynton, Thames & Hudson (2003)

External links
 Official website
 
 Profile on Royal Academy of Arts Collections

20th-century Scottish painters
Scottish male painters
Artists from Northern Ireland
1913 births
1989 deaths
British still life painters
People from Greenock
Alumni of Ulster University
Royal Academicians
20th-century Scottish male artists